Ebenezer is an unincorporated community in Preble County, in the U.S. state of Ohio.

History
A post office called Ebenezer was established in 1866, and remained in operation until 1902. The Ebenezer post office once served nearby Gettysburg as well.

References

Unincorporated communities in Preble County, Ohio
Unincorporated communities in Ohio